The 2009–10 Associazione Calcio Milan season was the 76th Serie A season in the history of the club.

Club

Management

Other information

Players

Squad information

Updated 18 August 2009.

List of 2009–10 transfers
(*) denotes a winter transfer

In

 *
 *

Out

Out on loan

Squad statistics
Updated to games played 16 May 2010.

|}

Note: Starting appearance + Substitute appearance

Competitions summary

Overall

Serie A

League table

Results summary

Results by round

Matches

Updated to games played on 7 February 2010.

Pre-season tournaments and friendlies

Serie A

Coppa Italia

UEFA Champions League

Player seasonal records
Competitive matches only. Numbers in brackets indicate appearances made. Updated to games played 28 March 2010.

Goalscorers

Goals conceded

References

A.C. Milan seasons
Milan